Carol Kirkwood (née MacKellaig) (born 29 May 1962) is a Scottish weather presenter, trained by the Met Office, and employed by the BBC, on BBC Breakfast. In 2015, she participated in the 13th series of BBC One's Strictly Come Dancing, finishing in 10th place.

Early life 
Born Carol MacKellaig on 29 May 1962 in Morar, Inverness-shire, she was one of eight children of parents who were hoteliers in Morar. After attending Lochaber High School in Fort William, Kirkwood gained a BA in commerce from Napier College of Commerce and Technology (now Edinburgh Napier University) in Edinburgh.

Career 
After graduation, Kirkwood joined the BBC's secretarial reserve in London. After a series of internal moves, she presented short slots on BBC Radio Scotland, and then BBC Radio 2 and BBC Radio 4. Following her marriage to Jimmy Kirkwood, she left the BBC and subsequently worked in recruitment and then as a training consultant for a management consultancy in Cheshire. In 1992, she spent time on a now defunct cable TV channel, Windsor TV, latterly called Wire TV, along with Sacha Baron Cohen.

Kirkwood rejoined the BBC at the corporation's Elstree Studios training department in 1993 as a freelance presenter, during which time she also presented a bi-monthly programme Talking Issues for HTV West. In 1996 Kirkwood joined the new UK operation of The Weather Channel, but after it closed down she underwent training under the guidance of the BBC at the Met Office, before joining BBC News in April 1998 as a weather presenter. She has since appeared regularly across all of BBC Weather's output on both radio and television, including BBC News, BBC World News, BBC News at Six and the live forecasts as part of the BBC's coverage of the Wimbledon Tennis Championships.

Kirkwood is the main weather presenter on BBC Breakfast. The programme moved from London to MediaCityUK in Salford in 2013 but Kirkwood stayed in London presenting the weather on Breakfast via video link. She presented the BBC's The Weather Show and is also a regular contributor and reporter for The One Show. In 2011, Kirkwood co-presented the BBC One series The Great British Weather. She also presented the weather on BBC Radio 2's The Chris Evans Breakfast Show. 
 
Kirkwood has appeared as a guest on CBBC's show Hacker Time. In 2014, she appeared on BBC One panel show Would I Lie to You? In October 2018, Kirkwood had a cameo appearance on Hollyoaks.

Strictly Come Dancing

In August 2015, it was announced that Kirkwood would be taking part in the thirteenth series of Strictly Come Dancing, which began in September 2015. She was partnered with professional dancer Pasha Kovalev.

Personal life

She was married to Jimmy Kirkwood; they divorced in 2008. Kirkwood announced her engagement to her new partner, live on BBC Breakfast from the Chelsea Flower Show, on 23 May 2022.

Awards
Kirkwood won the TRIC award for best TV Weather Presenter in 2003, 2008, 2009 and 2012–2017. She received an Honorary Fellowship from Princess Anne for "contributions to broadcasting" at Inverness College, part of the University of the Highlands and Islands, on 17 November 2015.

TV appearances
BBC Breakfast (1997–present) – Weather presenter
The Great British Weather – Co-presenter
Hacker Time – Guest
The Weather Show – Presenter
The One Show – Reporter
Would I Lie to You? (2013) – Guest, 1 episode
Victoria Derbyshire (2015–2020) – Weather presenter
Strictly Come Dancing (2015) – Participant
Hollyoaks (2018) – Cameo appearance as Weather presenter
The People vs Climate Change (2021) – Narrator
Saturday Kitchen (2022) – Guest, 1 episode

Books
 Under a Greek Moon (HarperCollins, 2021) 
 The Hotel on the Riviera (HarperCollins, 2022)

References

External links 

 
 Carol Kirkwood on Twitter

1962 births
Living people
Alumni of Edinburgh Napier University
BBC Radio 2 presenters
BBC Radio 4 presenters
BBC Radio Scotland presenters
BBC weather forecasters
BBC World News
People educated at Lochaber High School
People from Lochaber
Scottish women radio presenters
Scottish television presenters
Scottish women television presenters
Weather presenters